Jacopo Bocchi (born 10 September 1994) is an Italian rugby union player.
His usual position is as a Lock. He plays for Mogliano in Top12 since 2011.

In 2011 was named in the Italy Under 20 squad for the annual IRB Junior World Championship.

References 

It's Rugby England Profile
Eurosport Profile
Ultimate Rugby Profile

1994 births
Living people
Italian rugby union players
Rugby union locks
Mogliano Rugby players